Stanisław Józef Ciosek (2 May 1939 – 19 October 2022) was a Polish diplomat and politician.

A member of the Polish United Workers' Party, he served in the Sejm from 1972 to 1985. Lastly, he served as Poland Ambassador to Russia from 1989 to 1996.

Ciosek died on 19 October 2022, at the age of 83.

References

1939 births
2022 deaths
Polish United Workers' Party members
Democratic Left Alliance politicians
Members of the Politburo of the Polish United Workers' Party
Ambassadors of Poland to the Soviet Union
Ambassadors of Poland to Russia
Commanders with Star of the Order of Polonia Restituta
Knights of the Order of Polonia Restituta
Officer's Crosses of the Order of the Lithuanian Grand Duke Gediminas
Commander's Crosses of the Order for Merits to Lithuania
Recipients of the Order of the White Star, 2nd Class
University of Gdańsk alumni
People from Lipsko County